Screamer is an unincorporated community in Maury County, in the U.S. state of Tennessee.

Screamer was so named in the 1840s on account of the frequent screaming of cougars.

References

Unincorporated communities in Maury County, Tennessee
Unincorporated communities in Tennessee